Faiz Issa Khadoom Al-Rushaidi (born 19 July 1988), commonly known as Faiz Al-Rushaidi, is an Omani footballer who plays for Mes Rafsanjan in the Persian Gulf Pro League.

Club career
On 3 June 2014, he signed a contract with 2014 GCC Champions League runners-up Saham SC. On 9 September 2021, he signed for Iranian side Mes Rafsanjan F.C.

Club career statistics

International career
Faiz is part of the first team squad of the Oman national football team. He was selected for the national team for the first time in 2010. He made his first appearance for Oman on 15 August 2012 in a friendly match against Egypt. He has made appearances in the 2012 WAFF Championship, the 2014 FIFA World Cup qualification and the 2015 AFC Asian Cup qualification and has represented the national team in the 2010 Gulf Cup of Nations and the 2013 Gulf Cup of Nations. He produced an outstanding performance against the UAE, saving two penalty shots from Omar Abdulrahman, winning the 2017 Gulf Cup of Nations.

He was selected for the 2019 AFC Asian Cup for Oman, but he initially served as second-choice goalkeeper to Ali Al-Habsi. However, Al-Habsi suffered an injury and was left out, thus he became the team's first choice goalkeeper and made appearances in the 4 games Oman played as Oman managed to reach the knockout stage for the first time.

Honours

Club
With Al-Suwaiq
Oman Elite League (3): 2009–10, 2010–11, 2012–13
Sultan Qaboos Cup (2): 2008, 2012
Oman Super Cup (1): 2013; Runner-Up 2009, 2010, 2011

Individual
2012–13 Oman Elite League: Best Goalkeeper of the League
2013–14 Oman Professional League: Best Goalkeeper of the League

National Team
With Oman national football team
23rd Arabian Gulf Cup (1)

References

External links
 
 
 
 
 

1988 births
Living people
People from Al-Rustaq
Omani footballers
Oman international footballers
Association football goalkeepers
Suwaiq Club players
Saham SC players
Al-Nasr SC (Salalah) players
Dhofar Club players
Oman Professional League players
Al-Ain FC (Saudi Arabia) players
Expatriate footballers in Saudi Arabia
Omani expatriate sportspeople in Saudi Arabia
Saudi First Division League players
2019 AFC Asian Cup players